Yassin Fekir (born 5 May 1997) is a French professional footballer who plays as a winger for Spanish club Real Balompédica Linense, on loan from Real Betis.

Career

Lyon
On 4 July 2017, Fekir signed his first professional contract with Olympique Lyonnais. He made his professional debut in a 3–2 Coupe de la Ligue win over Amiens SC on 19 December 2018, coming on as an 86th-minute substitute for Bertrand Traoré. On 3 March 2019 he played his first Ligue 1 game, coming on for the last 11 minutes in place of Moussa Dembélé in a 5–1 win against Toulouse.

Betis
On 23 July 2019, Fekir signed for Spanish club Real Betis as part of the deal which also saw his brother Nabil Fekir move to Betis. Lyon will reserve 50% of any future sale of Yassin as well. He was initially assigned to the B-team in Tercera División, and on the last day of transfer window, he was loaned out for the season to CD Guijuelo of Segunda División B.

Fekir was promoted to the Betis first team squad on 1 February 2021, and registered for the rest of the La Liga season. On 31 August, he was demoted back to the B-team for the 2021–22 Primera División RFEF.

Personal life
Fekir is the younger brother of the French international footballer Nabil Fekir. Fekir is of Algerian descent.

Career statistics

Club

References

External links
 
  
 

1997 births
Living people
French sportspeople of Algerian descent
Footballers from Lyon
French footballers
Association football wingers
Ligue 1 players
Championnat National 2 players
Championnat National 3 players
Olympique Lyonnais players
La Liga players
Primera Federación players
Segunda División B players
CD Guijuelo footballers
Betis Deportivo Balompié footballers
Real Betis players
Real Balompédica Linense footballers
French expatriate footballers
French expatriate sportspeople in Spain
Expatriate footballers in Spain